The white-cheeked pintail (Anas bahamensis), also known as the Bahama pintail or summer duck, is a species of dabbling duck. It was first described by Carl Linnaeus in his landmark 1758 10th edition of Systema Naturae under its current scientific name.

Distribution and habitat
It is found in the Caribbean, South America, and the Galápagos Islands. It occurs on waters with some salinity, such as brackish lakes, estuaries and mangrove swamps.

There are three subspecies:
 A. b. bahamensis—lesser Bahama pintail—in the Caribbean, and a vagrant to southern Florida
 A. b. rubirostris—greater Bahama pintail—in South America; it may be partly migratory, breeding in Argentina and wintering further north.
 A. b. galapagensis—Galápagos pintail—in the Galápagos Islands

Description
Like many southern ducks, the sexes are similar. It is mainly brown with white cheeks and a red-based grey bill (young birds lack the pink). It cannot be confused with any other duck in its range.

Behaviour
The white-cheeked pintail feeds on aquatic plants (such as Ruppia), grass seeds, algae and small creatures (such as insects and small aquatic invertebrates) obtained by dabbling. The nest is on the ground under vegetation and near water.

Aviculture
It is popular in wildfowl collections, and escapees are frequently seen in a semi-wild condition in Europe. A leucistic (whitish) variant is known in aviculture as the silver Bahama pintail.

Gallery

References

External links 

 White-cheeked pintail videos, photos, and sounds on the Internet Bird Collection

white-cheeked pintail
Birds of the Caribbean
Birds of Hispaniola
Birds of the Dominican Republic
Birds of Haiti
Birds of South America
Galápagos Islands coastal fauna
white-cheeked pintail
white-cheeked pintail